is a Japanese concept referring to something that gives a person a sense of purpose, a reason for living.

Meaning and etymology 

The Oxford English Dictionary defines  as "a motivating force; something or someone that gives a person a sense of purpose or a reason for living". More generally it may refer to something that brings pleasure or fulfilment.

Overview
 can describe having a sense of purpose in life, as well as being motivated. According to a study by Michiko Kumano, feeling  as described in Japanese usually means the feeling of accomplishment and fulfillment that follows when people pursue their passions.

According to psychologist Katsuya Inoue,  is a concept consisting of two aspects: "sources or objects that bring value or meaning to life" and "a feeling that one's life has value or meaning because of the existence of its source or object". Inoue classifies  into three directions – social , non-social , and anti-social  – from a social perspective. Social  refers to  that are accepted by society through volunteer activities and circle activities. An asocial  is an  that is not directly related to society, such as faith or self-discipline.

National Geographic reporter Dan Buettner suggested  may be one of the reasons for the longevity of the people of Okinawa. According to Buettner, Okinawans have less desire to retire, as people continue to do their favourite job as long as they remain healthy. , a close-knit friend group, is also considered an important reason for the people of Okinawa to live long.

Early popularisation 
Although the concept of  has long existed in Japanese culture, it was first popularised by Japanese psychiatrist and academic Mieko Kamiya in her 1966 book . The book has not yet been translated into English.

Importance 
In the 1960s, 1970s and 1980s,  was thought to be experienced towards either the betterment of society ("subordinating one's own desires to others") or improvement of oneself ("following one's own path").

According to anthropologist Chikako Ozawa-de Silva, for an older generation in Japan, their  was to "fit this standard mold of company and family", whereas the younger generation reported their  to be about "dreams of what they might become in the future".

Multiple studies showed that people who do not feel  are more likely to experience cardiovascular diseases. However, there was no evidence of any correlation with development of malignant tumors.

See also
Raison d%27%C3%AAtre
Joie de vivre
Logotherapy
Meaning-making

References

External links
"Factors associated with 'Ikigai' among members of a public temporary employment agency for seniors (Silver Human Resources Centre) in Japan; gender differences", Health and Quality of Life Outcomes. 2006; 4:12 (retrieved Nov 2008).
"Ikigai and Mortality" Psychology Today. 17 Sep 2008 (retrieved Jan 2010).
"Dan Buettner: How to live to be 100+" TED talk about longevity that explains the word in the Okinawan context. Jan 2010.
 Japan's formula for life satisfaction. By Lily Crossley-Baxter, 11 May 2020, bbc.com.

Happiness
Japanese culture
Japanese words and phrases
Mental states
Self
Sociological terminology
Words and phrases describing personality